The Journal of Political Ecology is an annual open access peer-reviewed academic journal covering political ecology. It was established in 1994 as one of the first open access journals in the social sciences, by James B. Greenberg and Thomas K. Park (University of Arizona), to experiment with online formats and to showcase new work in the emerging field of political ecology. The current editors-in-chief are Simon P.J. Batterbury (University of Melbourne and Lancaster University) and Casey Walsh (University of California, Santa Barbara). There is an international editorial board.

Publication
Unlike the majority of academic journals it is produced free of charge for readers and authors using voluntary academic labour, and its website is hosted at the University of Arizona library. There is no journal budget and editorial work is voluntary. The Journal of Political Ecology is abstracted and indexed in Scopus, and the number of articles published, and citation index, has risen substantially since 2014. The journal publishes Eric Wolf Prize papers submitted by early career scholars to the Society for Applied Anthropology annual meetings in the United States. The journal is a founding member of the Free Journal Network that supports and lobbies for quality open access publishing.

Scope
The scope of the journal is research into the linkages between political economy and human impact on the environment, particularly where there are inequalities in access to resources, or an increase in vulnerability, as a result of resource use or assertion of political power. Articles must address some aspect of this relationship, framed in political ecology, and topics have ranged from mining and indigenous peoples of Oceania, to drug production in Lesotho, marine protected area management in Vietnam, the sandalwood trade in East Timor, environmental pollution in post-communist countries, water consumption and management in the United States West and Mexico, and the plight of Adivasi peoples living in national parks in India. Special issues are occasionally published, for example: Ecologies of Hope, edited by S. Ravi Rajan and Colin Duncan in 2013; Non-capitalist political ecologies, edited by Brian Burke and Boone Shear and Degrowth, Culture and Power, edited by Lisa Gezon and Susan Paulson in 2017.

The four most important research areas covered by the 145 articles published as of late 2014 were 1) food and agricultural issues 2) social aspects of conservation 3) fishing issues and 4) mining and social struggles.

Abstracting and indexing
The journal is abstracted and indexed in:

References

External links 
 

Environmental social science journals
Publications established in 1994
Open access journals
English-language journals
Annual journals
University of Arizona
Environmental economics
Human ecology
Political ecology
Political economy
Anthropology journals
Geography journals
Multidisciplinary social science journals
Political science journals